The General Artigas Station, also  referred to as the Artigas Base is the larger of the two Uruguayan scientific research stations in Antarctica, the other one being Elichiribehety Base. It is one of the 68 bases in Antarctica.

Organization
The Artigas Base depends on the Uruguayan Antarctic Institute Plans & Operations Direction which is ruled by an Interministerial Council, with delegates of MoD, Foreign Affairs and ministry of Education and Culture.
Uruguay, a Consultative member of Antarctic Treaty since 7 October 1985, has a permanent, active and autonomous activity as a National Governmental Program in Antarctic. It comes to effect operating an all year round station in King George Island, South Shetland, and seasonally at Antarctic Peninsula, and onboard its vessel, where performs scientific activity based on SCAR & Treaty needs and recommendations, supported by own logistic sea and air transport, and operating under COMNAP guidelines. Has delegates and members as full member of SCAR, SCAR-WG, COMNAP-SCALOP networks & WG, CCAMLR and ATCM.-

Since 1984 research has been performed in these areas:

Glaciology:
General Glaciology on KGI, South Shetlands, and Antarctic Peninsula, in various fields aiming to detect environmental changes due to anthropogenic activities and those related as response to climatic changes. This program is in scope of SCAR recommendations and is being carried out in cooperation with other nations operating in Antarctica(KORDI)

Atmospheric sciences
Calibration of effects of the atmosphere on metals commonly used in the Antarctic
Mossbauer spectroscopy to identify atmospheric corrosion products
Installation and operation of an ionospheric laboratory at Artigas, the Uruguayan year-round research station on King George Island

Ocean sciences
Comparative studies of physical and chemical variables in coastal waters of Fildes Bay
Observations of the Antarctic Polar Front (Antarctic Convergence)
Marine meteorology of Drake passage, according to SCAR and Treaty objectives.

Earth sciences
Satellite geodesy applications for SCAR_EPOCH & GIANT Program

Life sciences
Medical research
Antarctic krill (Euphausia superba) vascular and lipid characteristics
Modification of collagen disease and atheroma in rabbits by adding krill to their diet
Ornithological observations in Fildes Peninsula (King George Island), South Bay (Livingston Island), and Harmony Point (Nelson Island), South Shetland Islands
Behavioral studies in a penguin colony in the South Shetland Islands

Logistics:
Are provided by the National Defense Ministry (of which the Uruguayan Antarctic Institute is a part) and the armed forces (army, navy, and air force), which also contribute to scientific programs.

Transport methods include Hercules C-130B airplanes, Bell 212 helicopters, Navy Ships and other seaborne units, amphibious vehicles, and various land vehicles.

Uruguayan Antarctic research is generally proportional to overall national efforts, although there is a special emphasis on life sciences and those related to changes in the environment.

Uruguay is particularly mindful of environmental matters and abides by all agreements and treaties pertinent to the Antarctic, so develops continuous environment monitoring programs complementing the impact assessments of its activities.

General information

Location of base 
 South Shetlands, KGI, Fildes Peninsula
 Lat: 62°11'04 Long: 58° 54 “
 17 m above sea level
 Ice free surface
 100 meters from the Antarctic coastline
 Bellingshausen Station nearest base
 Usuahia (1000 km) nearest port

Major dates 
 Station opened 22 December 1984
 Breaks in operation:22/12/84

Population 
 60 persons capacity
 9 average summer population
 8 average winter population

Additional notes 
Around 10 scientists in summer, 6 crew for helicopter, 3-5 for maintenance, 4 servicemen.

Science activities 

The following science activities are carried out at Base Cientifica Antárctica Artigas:
 Environmental monitoring (since 1998)
 Geodesy/mapping (since 1986)
 Glaciology - continental (since 1991)
 Human biology (since 1985)
 Ionospheric/auroral observations (since 1992)
 Meteorological observations (since 1984)
 Stratospheric ozone monitoring (since 1998)
 Tide measurement (since 1989)

Observations and scientific programs

Station infrastructure 
Area and buildings
 24000 total station area
 13 buildings

Power and fuel supply 
 220 V 60 Hz power supply
 375 kVA power generation capacity
 3 generators
 Generators fuelled with winter blend fuel
 160.000 lts of fuel used annually
 none wind generator

Water and sewage 
 Potable water supply source/method:Lake
 876000 of water used each year

Medical facilities 
 Base Cientifica Antárctica Artigas has the following medical facilities:
 30 sqm medical suite
 1 doctor
 0 paramedic(s)
 2 beds for patients
 MEDEVAC & Fire Plan updated and exercised

Logistic support 
 Ice
 Ice breakout: October
 Fast ice formation: late May
 Shipping
 1 ship visit(s) per season
 1 resupply visit(s) per season (in January)
 300 m from station to anchorage
 30 m deep anchorage
 Air transport
 7 intercontinental flights per season
 Aircraft used: Hercules C-130
 Light aircraft/helicopter available December–March
 Types used: Bell 212
 1 concrete & 1 rock for Helicopter airstrip surface
 at base from station to airstrip
 Other support transport
 Tracked personnel carriers: 2x Hagglunds
 Snowmobiles: 1x snowmobile
 Rough terrain quads/tricycles: 1x quad
 Outboard watercraft: 2x zodiacs
 Trucks
 1xIFA
 Tractors, loaders, excavators
 Wheeled tractor(s): 1 massey ferguson

See also
 List of Antarctic research stations
 List of Antarctic field camps

References

External links

  Uruguayan Antarctic Institute
  Antarkos 23, the 2007 Artigas Base Crew
 OMNI article: 11th Sep 2007, eclipse of sun views from Artigas base
 Antarctica Trip, a Cristy Trembly report on her visit to Artigas and ECARE bases in 2000.
 Antarctica Marathon 2007: William Smith blog's post including Artigas Base views and comments
 COMNAP Antarctic Facilities
 COMNAP Antarctic Facilities Map

Outposts of the South Shetland Islands
Uruguay and the Antarctic
José Gervasio Artigas
1984 establishments in Antarctica